The United Nations Digital Library is a primary bibliographic database of the United Nations established in 1979. It consists the UN and non-UN documents and publications documented by the Dag Hammarskjold Library in six languages, such as Arabic, Chinese, English, French, Russian and Spanish. However, it uses English for file language. It uses Secure Electronic Transmission Permitted communication protocol and is the only digital library of the UN.

The database is regularly updated with the records of the UN General Assembly, Security Council, and the United Nations Economic and Social Council. All hyperlinks are connected to the United Nations Official Document System (ODS) for obtaining access to password-free documents, including speech references.

It has maintained a record in digital format from 1982 to present century on various subjects, including voting, bibliographic files, speeches files, full text UN resolutions, document series symbol, UNBIS thesaurus (dictionary or encyclopedia), and name authorities.

Features 
It provides linked data related to a document within database text. A user may obtain information by applying a search filter to UN agencies, bodies, and type of document in English language. It also provides new content alerts (notifications). Search by publication date functionalities are also available while looking for a document.

Documents 
It consists metadata of about 1 million available in 6 languages. It digitalise thousands of publications annually focused on various types, including resolutions, reports of secretary-general, "meeting records, annual reports, agendas, lists of participants, statistical data sets, and policy papers".

References 

United Nations documents
1979 establishments
Swiss digital libraries